Diving was contested at the 2015 Summer Universiade from July 3 to 9 at the Nambu University International Aquatics Center in Gwangju, South Korea.

Medal summary

Medal table

Men's events

Women's events

Mixed

References

External links
 2015 Summer Universiade – Diving

 
2015 in diving
2015 Summer Universiade events
Diving at the Summer Universiade